Uge or UGE may refer to:

 Uge Station, a railway station in Japan
 Uge language, of Nigeria
 Ughele language (ISO 639:uge), of the Solomon Islands
 UGE International, a renewable energy company
 Univa Grid Engine, a batch-queuing system